The world, the flesh, and the devil are often traditionally described as the three enemies of the soul in Christian theology.

The world, the flesh, and the devil may also refer to:

 The World, the Flesh & the Devil: An Enquiry into the Future of the Three Enemies of the Rational Soul, a 1929 non-fiction book by J.D. Bernal
 The World, the Flesh and the Devil (1891 novel), an English novel by Mary Elizabeth Braddon
 The World, the Flesh and the Devil (1914 film), a British drama film
 The World, the Flesh and the Devil (1959 film), an American science fiction film
 The World, the Flesh and the Devil, a 1985 Scottish historical novel, by Reay Tannahill

See also

 The World, the Flesh, and Father Smith, a 1944 novel by Bruce Marshall
 The World, the Flesh, the Devil, a 1932 British crime film
 Flesh and the Devil, a 1926 romantic drama silent film